In set theory, a Kurepa tree is a tree (T, <) of height ω1, each of whose levels is at most countable, and has at least ℵ2 many branches. The existence of a Kurepa tree (known as the Kurepa hypothesis, though Kurepa originally conjectured that this was false) is consistent with the axioms of ZFC: Solovay showed in unpublished work that there are Kurepa trees in Gödel's constructible universe . More precisely, the existence of Kurepa trees follows from the diamond plus principle, which holds in the constructible universe. On the other hand,  showed that if a strongly inaccessible cardinal is Lévy collapsed to ω2 then, in the resulting model, there are no Kurepa trees. The existence of an inaccessible cardinal is in fact equiconsistent with the failure of the Kurepa hypothesis, because if the Kurepa hypothesis is false then the cardinal ω2 is inaccessible in the constructible universe.

A Kurepa tree with fewer than 2ℵ1 branches is known as a Jech–Kunen tree.

More generally if κ is an infinite cardinal, then a κ-Kurepa tree is a tree of height κ with more than κ branches but at most |α| elements of each infinite level α<κ, and the Kurepa hypothesis for κ is the statement that there is a κ-Kurepa tree. Sometimes the tree is also assumed to be binary. The existence of a binary κ-Kurepa tree is equivalent to the existence of a Kurepa family: a set of more than κ subsets of κ such that their intersections with any infinite ordinal α<κ form a set of cardinality at most α. The Kurepa hypothesis is false if κ is an ineffable cardinal, and conversely Jensen showed that in the constructible universe for any uncountable regular cardinal κ there is a κ-Kurepa tree unless κ is ineffable.

Specializing a Kurepa tree 

A Kurepa tree can be "killed" by forcing the existence of a function whose value on any non-root node is an ordinal less than the rank of the node, such that whenever three nodes, one of which is a lower bound for the other two, are mapped to the same ordinal, then the three nodes are comparable.  This can be done without collapsing ℵ1, and results in a tree with exactly ℵ1 branches.

See also 
 Aronszajn tree
 Suslin tree

References 

 

Trees (set theory)
Independence results